I'll Fix It is a 1934 American romantic comedy film directed by Roy William Neill and starring Jack Holt, Mona Barrie and Winnie Lightner. An extremely powerful machine politics fixer is frustrated when his attempts to secure his younger brother a place on a school football team are blocked by an independent-minded female schoolteacher he rules that he has not showing enough academic progress.

Cast
 Jack Holt as Bill Grimes  
 Mona Barrie as Anne Barry  
 Winnie Lightner as Elizabeth  
 Jimmy Butler as Bobby Grimes  
 Edward Brophy as Tilly Tilson  
 Nedda Harrigan as Miss Burns  
 Charles R. Moore as Nifty 
 Helena Phillips Evans as Mrs. Murphy  
 Charles Lane as Al Nathan 
 John Wray as Fletcher  
 Wallis Clark as Cohagen  
 Edward Van Sloan as Parkes  
 Clarence Wilson as John Stevens  
 Robert Gunn as  Skinny 
 Dorian Johnston as Percy

Preservation status
A print is preserved in the Library of Congress collection.

References

Bibliography
 Palmer, Scott. British Film Actors' Credits, 1895-1987. McFarland, 1988.

External links
 
 

1934 films
1934 romantic comedy films
American romantic comedy films
Films directed by Roy William Neill
Columbia Pictures films
American black-and-white films
1930s English-language films
1930s American films